Hatch or The Hatch may refer to:

Common meanings

Biology
Hatch, to emerge from an egg
Hatch(ing), the process of egg incubation

Portals
Hatch, a sealed or secure door of a ship, submarine, aircraft, spacecraft, or automobile
Hatch, a sluice gate
Hatch, a trapdoor, a door on a floor or ceiling

Places

Antarctica
Hatch Islands, Wilkes Land, Antarctica
Hatch Plain, Coats Land, Antarctica

Australia
The Hatch, New South Wales, a suburb within Port Macquarie-Hastings Council

England
Hatch, Bedfordshire, a hamlet
Hatch Beauchamp, Somerset
Hatch Park, a Site of Special Scientific Interest in Kent
East Hatch and West Hatch, hamlets within the parish of West Tisbury, Wiltshire
West Hatch, hamlet and civil parish in Somerset

United States
Hatch, Idaho, an unincorporated community
Hatch, Missouri, an unincorporated community
Hatch, New Mexico, a village
Hatch, Utah, a town
Hatch Airport, an airport in Stayton, Oregon

People with the name
Hatch (surname)
Harrison Hatch Rosdahl (1941–2004), American football player

Arts, entertainment, and media
Hatch, a bug-like villain from the TV show Hot Wheels Battle Force 5
The Hatch, the third DHARMA Initiative station in the television show Lost

Other uses
Hatch chile, sub-cultivars of the New Mexico chile pepper cultivar group grown near Hatch, New Mexico
Hatch (e-commerce company), an ecommerce platform based in Amsterdam
Hatch Ltd, an engineering and development consulting company based in Canada
Hatch-class lifeboat, formerly operated by the Royal National Lifeboat Institution of the United Kingdom and Ireland

See also
Hatch Act of 1887, United States legislation
Hatch Act of 1939, United States legislation
Hatchback, an automobile design
Hatching (disambiguation)